Luca Vitali (born 30 March 1992) is an Italian motorcycle racer. His father, Maurizio Vitali, is a former motorcycle racer. He currently competes in the European Superstock 1000 Championship for aboard an Aprilia RSV4. He previously competed in the 125cc World Championship, the FIM CEV International Moto2 Championship, the CIV Stock 600 Championship, the CIV 125GP Championship and the European Superstock 600 Championship.

Career statistics

2008- 11th, CIV 125GP Championship #10    Aprilia RS 125 R
2009- NC, 125cc Grand Prix #10    Aprilia RS 125 R
2010- 8th, CIV Stock 600 Championship #10    Yamaha YZF-R6
2011- 5th, CIV Stock 600 Championship #70    Yamaha YZF-R6
2012- 6th, European Superstock 600 Championship #70 Yamaha YZF-R6
2012- 4th, CIV Stock 600 Championship #70    Yamaha YZF-R6
2013- 8th, European Superstock 600 Championship #70 Suzuki GSX-R600
2013- 3rd, CIV Stock 600 Championship #70    Suzuki GSX-R600
2014- 6th, FIM CEV Moto2 Championship #70    Ariane Moto2
2015- 7th, European Superstock 600 Championship #70    Kawasaki ZX-6R
2016- 12th, FIM Superstock 1000 Cup #70 BMW S1000RR
2017- 10th, European Superstock 1000 Championship #70    Aprilia RSV4
2018- European Superstock 1000 Championship #70    Aprilia RSV4

Grand Prix motorcycle racing

By season

Races by year
(key) (Races in bold indicate pole position; races in italics indicate fastest lap)

References

External links
 Profile on MotoGP.com
 Profile on WorldSBK.com

1992 births
Sportspeople from Rimini
Living people
Italian motorcycle racers
125cc World Championship riders
FIM Superstock 1000 Cup riders